Hills Road is an arterial road (part of the A1307) in southeast Cambridge, England. It runs between Regent Street at the junction with Lensfield Road and Gonville Place (the A603) to the northwest and a roundabout by the Cambridge Biomedical Campus, continuing as Babraham Road (also part of the A1307) to the southeast.

On the corner with Lensfield Road is Our Lady and the English Martyrs Church. To the west of the road is the Cambridge University Botanic Garden. At this point, near the Cambridge War Memorial, Station Road leads to Cambridge railway station to the east. Near the southeast end to the west, just north of the junction with Long Road, is The Perse School, an independent school. The Cambridge Biomedical Campus is to the southwest of the roundabout at the southeastern end, at the edge of the city and houses Addenbrooke's Hospital. The original hospital was located on the Old Addenbrooke's Site on Trumpington Street in central Cambridge.

Also on Hills Road are:

 Homerton College, a constituent college of the University of Cambridge
 The Perse School
 Cambridge Cancer Genomics, a biotechnology company using artificial intelligence to tailor cancer therapies. 
 Hills Road Sixth Form College
 St John the Evangelist church

References 

Streets in Cambridge
Transport in Cambridge
Roads in Cambridgeshire
Homerton College, Cambridge